Hirom (also Romanized as Hīrom; also known as Hīrūm) is a village in Qalat Rural District, Bidshahr district, Evaz County, Fars Province, Iran. At the 2006 census, its population was 266, in 42 families.

References 

Populated places in Evaz County